Embakasi Central is a constituency in Nairobi. Embakasi Central includes five electoral wards: Kayole North, Kayole Central, Kayole South, Komarock, and Matopeni/Spring Valley.

Members 

 Benjamin Mwangi

References 

Constituencies in Nairobi